Jennifer Ann Agutter  (born 20 December 1952) is a British actress. She began her career as a child actress in 1964, appearing in East of Sudan, Star!,  and two adaptations of The Railway Children—the BBC's 1968 television serial and the 1970 film version. She also starred in the critically acclaimed film Walkabout  and the TV film The Snow Goose (both 1971), for which she won an Emmy Award for Outstanding Supporting Actress in a Drama.

She relocated to the United States in 1974 to pursue a Hollywood career and subsequently appeared in Logan's Run (1976), Amy (1981), An American Werewolf in London (1981), and Child's Play 2 (1990). During the same period, Agutter continued appearing in high-profile British films, such as The Eagle Has Landed (1976), Equus (1977) (for which she won a BAFTA Award for Best Actress in a Supporting Role), and The Riddle of the Sands (1979). In 1981, she co-starred in The Survivor, an Australian adaptation of the James Herbert novel by that name, and was nominated for an AACTA Award for Best Actress in a Leading Role.

After returning to Britain in the early 1990s to pursue family life, Agutter shifted her focus to television, appearing in the 2000 version of television adaptation of The Railway Children, this time as the mother, and since 2012 she has had an ongoing role in the BBC's Call the Midwife. Her film work in recent years includes The Avengers (2012) and Captain America: The Winter Soldier (2014), and in 2022, Agutter returned to the world of The Railway Children once more by reprising her role from the 1970 film 52 years later in a sequel, The Railway Children Return.

Agutter is married, and has  one adult son. She supports several charitable causes, mostly ones related to cystic fibrosis, a condition from which her niece suffers, and for her service to those causes was appointed Officer of the Order of the British Empire (OBE) in the 2012 Birthday Honours.

Early life
Agutter was born on 20 December 1952 in Taunton, Somerset, England. She is the daughter of Derek Agutter (an entertainments manager in the British Army) and Catherine, and was raised Roman Catholic. She has Irish ancestry on her mother's side. As a child, she lived in Singapore, Dhekelia (Cyprus) and Kuala Lumpur (Malaya). She was discovered at Elmhurst Ballet School, a boarding school she attended from ages eight to sixteen, when a casting agent was looking for a young English-speaking girl for a film. She did not get that part, but he recommended her to the producers of East of Sudan (1964).

Career

Television and film

Agutter became known to television audiences for her role in the twice-weekly BBC series The Newcomers. (She played Kirsty, the daughter of the new managing director of Eden Brothers, the fictional firm that is at the centre of the series.) Agutter could appear only during school holidays. At this stage of her career, she was listed in credits as “Jennifer”. In 1966, she portrayed a ballet pupil in Disney's film Ballerina. In 1968, she was featured in the lavish big-budget 20th Century Fox film musical Star! which featured Julie Andrews as Gertrude Lawrence; Agutter played Lawrence's neglected daughter Pamela. Later, she played Roberta in a BBC adaptation of The Railway Children (1968) and in Lionel Jeffries's 1970 film of the book. She followed this with a more serious role in the thriller I Start Counting (1969). She also won an Emmy as supporting actress for her television role as Fritha in a British television adaptation of The Snow Goose (1971).

Agutter then moved into adult roles, beginning with Walkabout (1971), in which she played a teenage schoolgirl who is lost with her younger brother in the Australian outback. She auditioned for the role in 1967, but funding problems delayed filming until 1969. The delay meant Agutter was 16 at the time of filming, which allowed the director to include nude scenes. Among them was a five-minute skinny-dipping scene, which was cut from the original US release. She said at the 2005 Bradford Film Festival at the National Media Museum that she was shocked by the film's explicitness, but remained on good terms with director Nicolas Roeg.

Agutter moved to Hollywood at 21 and appeared in a number of films over the next decade, including The Eagle Has Landed (1976), Logan's Run (1976), Equus (1977), for which she won a BAFTA as Best Supporting Actress), An American Werewolf in London (1981), and an adaptation of the James Herbert novel The Survivor (1981). Agutter has commented that the innocence of the characters she played in her early films, combined with the costumes and nudity in later adult roles such as Logan's Run, Equus, and An American Werewolf in London, are "perfect fantasy fodder".

In 1990, Agutter returned to the UK to concentrate on family life and her focus shifted towards British television. During the 1990s, she was cast in an adaptation of Jeffrey Archer's novel Not a Penny More, Not a Penny Less and as the scandalous Idina Hatton in the BBC miniseries The Buccaneers, inspired by Edith Wharton's unfinished 1938 book, and made guest appearances in television series such as Red Dwarf and Heartbeat. In 2000, she starred in a third adaptation of The Railway Children, produced by Carlton TV, this time playing the mother. Since then Agutter has had recurring roles in several television series including Spooks, The Invisibles, Monday Monday and The Alan Clark Diaries. In 2012 Agutter resumed her Hollywood career, appearing as a member of the World Security Council in the blockbuster film The Avengers; she reprised her role in Captain America: The Winter Soldier (2014). Since 2012, Agutter has played Sister Julienne in the BBC television drama series Call the Midwife.

Theatre
Agutter has appeared in numerous theatre productions since her stage debut in 1970, including stints at the National Theatre in 1972–73, the title role in a derivation of Hedda Gabler at the Roundhouse in 1980 and with the Royal Shakespeare Company in 1982–83, playing Alice in Arden of Faversham, Regan in King Lear and Fontanelle in Lear. In 1987–88, Agutter played the role of Pat Green in the Broadway production of the Hugh Whitemore play Breaking the Code, about computer pioneer Alan Turing.  In 1995 she was in an RSC production of Love's Labour's Lost staged in Tokyo.  She is also a patron of the Shakespeare Schools Festival, a charity that enables school children in the UK to perform Shakespeare in professional theatres.

Audio
In 2008, she also guest-starred in the Doctor Who audio drama The Bride of Peladon and played an outlawed scientist in The Minister of Chance. She has appeared as a guest star character ("Fiona Templeton") in the Radio 4 comedy Ed Reardon's Week.

Music
Agutter appears on the 1990 Prefab Sprout song "Wild Horses", speaking the words "I want to have you".

Personal life
At a 1989 arts festival in Bath, Somerset, Agutter met Johan Tham, a Swedish hotelier who was a director of Cliveden Hotel in Buckinghamshire. They married in August 1990, and their son Jonathan was born on 25 December 1990. Agutter lives in London, but has a keen interest in Cornwall and once owned a second home there on the Trelowarren Estate, in one of the parishes on the Lizard peninsula.

She was appointed an Officer of the Order of the British Empire (OBE) in the 2012 Birthday Honours, for her charitable services.

Agutter has been attached to several causes throughout her career. She has been involved in raising awareness of the illness cystic fibrosis, which she believes was responsible for the deaths of two of her siblings. Her niece has the disease. At Agutter's suggestion, an episode of Call the Midwife focused on cystic fibrosis. She has also worked in support of charities, in particular the Cystic Fibrosis Trust, of which she is a patron (she is also a carrier of the genetic mutation).

Politics
In August 2014, Agutter was also one of 200 public figures who were signatories to a letter to The Guardian expressing their hope that Scotland would vote to remain part of the United Kingdom in September 2014's referendum on that issue.

Filmography

Film

Television

Awards and nominations

References

External links

 
 
 Jenny Agutter at the TCM Movie Database
 

Living people
1952 births
20th-century English actresses
21st-century English actresses
Actresses from Somerset
Best Supporting Actress BAFTA Award winners
English child actresses
English film actresses
English stage actresses
English television actresses
People educated at the Elmhurst School for Dance
People from Taunton
Officers of the Order of the British Empire
Outstanding Performance by a Supporting Actress in a Drama Series Primetime Emmy Award winners
English people of Irish descent